Paweł Zaremba (12 October 1915 in Petrograd, Russian Empire] – 23 April 1979 in Munich, Germany) was a Polish historian, publicist, lawyer, radio journalist and publisher. His area of study was primarily history of Poland, history of the United States and history of the interwar period.

Zaremba was an editor of Orzeł Biały ("The White Eagle") and Pokrzywy ("Nettles"), managing director of publishing house Gryf in London, collaborator with the Parisian Kultura ("The Culture"). In 1967 he became a collaborator with Polish section of the Radio Free Europe.

He was an observer during the Spanish Civil War (1936–1939) and participant of the Invasion of Poland (1939). Until the end of World War II Zaremba stayed in the Oflag VII-A Murnau POW camp in Murnau am Staffelsee. After liberation, Zaremba joined to II Corps in Italy. In 1946 he settled in England.

Works

Works edited by Zaremba

References

1915 births
1979 deaths
Historians of Poland
Historians of the United States
Writers from Saint Petersburg
20th-century Polish historians
Polish male non-fiction writers
Polish publicists
Polish radio journalists
Polish publishers (people)
Polish emigrants to the United Kingdom
20th-century Polish lawyers
People associated with the magazine "Kultura"